Last Resort is an American military drama television series that aired on ABC from September 27, 2012, to January 24, 2013. The series was created by Shawn Ryan and Karl Gajdusek, and produced by Sony Pictures Television. On November 16, 2012, ABC announced that the series would not be picked up for another season, and the show finished with its original 13 episodes.

Plot
When the crew of the U.S. Navy Ohio-class ballistic missile submarine, the USS Colorado (SSBN-753), pick up a U.S. Navy SEAL team off Pakistan's coast, the Colorado receives an order to launch nuclear ballistic missiles at Pakistan.

Colorados Commanding Officer, Captain Marcus Chaplin (Andre Braugher), asks for confirmation of the firing order because the orders were received through a legacy Cold War secondary communication channel, only to be used in the event that Washington, D.C. has already been destroyed. After confirming Washington's continued existence and refusing to fire the missiles until the command is sent through the proper system, Chaplin is relieved of command by the Deputy Secretary of Defense William Curry, and the Colorados second in command, Lieutenant Commander Sam Kendal (Scott Speedman), is given command instead. When Kendal also questions the orders and asks for confirmation, the vessel is fired upon by the Virginia-class attack submarine USS Illinois (SSN-786). Two nuclear missile strikes are subsequently made on Pakistan by other U.S. submarines.

Realizing they have been declared enemies of their own country, the Colorado seeks refuge on the island of Sainte Marina (a fictional French island located in the Indian Ocean) and commandeer a NATO communications and early missile warning facility. When a pair of B-1 bombers is sent to attack the submarine and island, Chaplin launches a Trident nuclear missile towards Washington, D.C. to impress upon the national leadership that he's serious. The B-1s turn away at the last minute, but Chaplin (who has altered the missile's final target coordinates) allows the missile to visibly overfly Washington, D.C. and explode  beyond in the open Atlantic, the explosion clearly visible from both Washington and New York City. Via a television feed to the media, he then declares a 200-mile exclusion zone around Sainte Marina.

Now, the crew must find a way to prove their innocence and find out who in the U.S. government has set them up, so they can finally return home.

As the series progresses, Chaplin finds himself having to become a reluctant ally with China, while trying to keep his own crew, led by Chief of the Boat Joseph Prosser (Robert Patrick), from rebelling against him. He must also combat the schemes of the local drug lord Julian Serrat (Sahr Ngaujah). The series also follows the efforts of Kylie Sinclair (Autumn Reeser), a weapons designer back home who allies with Christine Kendal (Jessy Schram), the wife of the Colorados XO, to discern the truth behind the nuclear attack on Pakistan and the Colorados fugitive status. An ongoing subplot involves a Navy SEAL named James King (Daniel Lissing) who, wracked with guilt over his role in the events leading to the nuking of Pakistan, cultivates a romance with one of the island's residents (Dichen Lachman) while surreptitiously aiding the XO.

The series concludes with a series of mutinies, ending with the Colorado destroyed with Chaplin still on board, the surviving crew returning home to the United States, the President assassinated, and the full story made public when Kylie Sinclair arranges for proof of the president and his administration's traitorous activities to be handed over to the press.

Cast and characters

Main
 Andre Braugher as Captain Marcus Chaplin
 Scott Speedman as the Executive Officer (XO), Lieutenant Commander Sam Kendal
 Daisy Betts as Lieutenant Grace Shepard, boat's navigator and daughter of Rear Admiral Arthur Shepard (a longtime friend of Captain Chaplin)
 Robert Patrick as Master Chief Petty Officer Joseph Prosser, Chief of the Boat (COB) of the USS Colorado
 Camille De Pazzis as Sophie Girard, French commander of the NATO Communications Facility
 Dichen Lachman as Tani Tumrenjack, owner of Sainte Marina Bar
 Daniel Lissing as Petty Officer James King, U.S. Navy SEAL
 Sahr Ngaujah as Julian Serrat, the local despot on Sainte Marina
 Autumn Reeser as Kylie Sinclair, a Washington lobbyist for her family's weapons manufacturing company
 Jessy Schram as Christine Kendal, wife of Lieutenant Commander Sam Kendal

Recurring
 Michael Ng as Sonar Chief Petty Officer Cameron Pitts
 Jessica Camacho as Petty Officer First Class Pilar Cortez
 Will Rothhaar as Petty Officer Josh Brannan
 Daniel Bess as the Communications Officer, Lieutenant Chris Cahill
 Michael Mosley as Senior Chief Petty Officer Hal Anders
 Michael King as Petty Officer Kevin Hawkes
 Omid Abtahi as NATO surveillance technician Nigel
 Bruce Davison as Rear Admiral Arthur Shepard, Lieutenant Grace Shepard's father
 Jay Karnes as Deputy Secretary of Defense, later promoted to Secretary of Defense William Curry
 Ernie Hudson as Speaker of the House Conrad Buell
 Jay Hernandez as U.S. government lawyer Paul Wells
 Gideon Emery as CIA operative Booth
 David Rees Snell as Petty Officer Barry Hopper, U.S. Navy SEAL
 Chin Han as Chinese envoy Zheng Min
 Michael Gaston as Bennett Sinclair, Kylie's industrialist father
 Tyler Tuione as Chief, Tani's father
 Kasim Saul as Seaman Lawrence

Development and production
ABC greenlit the pilot in January 2012, allowing filming to begin. The show was filmed in Oahu, Hawaii, and produced by Sony Pictures Television. Thirteen episodes were ordered, and on October 19, 2012, ABC ordered two additional scripts for the series.

On November 16, 2012, ABC announced that they would not be taking on Last Resort for a full season, but would air the 13 episodes that had been produced. They also passed on producing the two additional scripts that had been ordered.

On November 21, 2012, the producers revealed they had been given sufficient notice of the network's cancellation plans so they could "tweak" the final episode to function as a series finale and give the fans some closure.

About the show’s cancellation, Andre Braugher said: "It ended abruptly and we had to scramble to create order where none existed before. But better to end like that than just simply to be told to go home and have it be incomplete. I had a lot of hopes for that series, but unfortunately, it never came together like it ought to have."

Episodes

International broadcast
In Canada, the show was simsubbed on Global. Sony's AXN channel aired the show in Asia from October 2, 2012. Within Oceania, Australia aired the series on the Seven Network from February 20, 2013, and debuted in New Zealand on Four on May 14, 2014. Last Resort aired in the United Kingdom and Ireland by Sky1 from October 30, 2012.

Home video release

Reception

Critical response
On Rotten Tomatoes, the series has an approval rating of 79% with an average score of 7.26 out of 10 based on 42 reviews. The website's critical consensus is, "Last Resort is a top-notch conspiracy thriller, with cinema-quality production and riveting action sequences." On Metacritic, the series has a score of 74 out of 100 based on 31 critics, indicating "generally favorable reviews".

Accolades

Notes

References

External links
 

2010s American drama television series
2012 American television series debuts
2013 American television series endings
American action television series
American Broadcasting Company original programming
English-language television shows
American military television series
Serial drama television series
Submarines in fiction
Television series by Sony Pictures Television
Television shows set in Pakistan